Somerset is an unincorporated town in Windham County, Vermont, United States. As of the 2020 census, it had a total population of 6.  Somerset is one of five unincorporated towns in Vermont, having been disincorporated in 1937. The town has no local government and the town's affairs are handled by a state-appointed supervisor.

Unincorporated communities in Bennington County, Vermont

Geography
According to the United States Census Bureau, the town had a total area of 28.1 square miles (72.9 km2), of which 26.1 square miles (67.7 km2) is land and 2.0 square miles (5.2 km2) is water. The total area is 7.07% water.  It is located high in the southern Green Mountains, with its little habitable terrain sandwiched between the main spine of those mountains and Mount Snow.

Demographics

At the 2000 census there were 5 people, 2 households, and 1 family residing in the town. The population density was 0.2 people per square mile (0.1/km2). There were 28 housing units at an average density of 1.1 per square mile (0.4/km2).  The racial makeup of the town was 100.00% White.
Of the 2 households 50.0% had children under the age of 18 living with them, 50.0% were married couples living together, and 50.0% were non-families. 50.0% of households were one person who were 65 or older. The average household size was 2.50 and the average family size was 4.00.

The age distribution was 40.0% under the age of 18, 40.0% from 25 to 44, and 20.0% who are 45 to 64 years old. The median age was 34 years. For every 100 females, there were 400.0 males. For every 100 females age 18 and over, there were 200.0 males.

Christmas tree
In 2007, the Capitol Christmas Tree was cut from the Green Mountain National Forest in Somerset.

Snow
On March 5, 1947, Somerset had  of snow on the ground, the greatest daily snow depth for any location anywhere in Vermont.

Notable people 

 Elbridge Boyden, noted Worcester architect
 Lyman Enos Knapp, governor of the District of Alaska (1889 to 1893)

References

External links

 Virtual Vermont

 
Former municipalities in Vermont
Towns in Vermont
Towns in Windham County, Vermont